Bernard Hamilton (June 12, 1928 – December 30, 2008) was an American actor. Best known as Captain Dobey in Starsky & Hutch (1975-1979).

Biography 
Hamilton was born in East Los Angeles; his brother was jazz drummer Chico Hamilton. He attended Oakland Technical High School, where he first became interested in acting. In films from 1950, he labored in bit roles for years before getting noticed in the film One Potato, Two Potato (1964), the story of an interracial marriage. He is best remembered for his role as the brusque, no-nonsense Captain Dobey in the United States 1970s police series Starsky and Hutch.

Hamilton was also an impresario; starting in the late 1960s he ran a nightclub/art gallery called Citadel d’Haiti on Sunset Boulevard. Hamilton also produced rhythm and blues and gospel music recordings on his own record label called Chocolate Snowman. One of his releases featured himself; it was entitled Captain Dobey Sings the Blues.

Hamilton died of cardiac arrest on December 30, 2008, aged 80. A US Army veteran in the Korean War, he was buried at Riverside National Cemetery in Riverside, California.

Selected filmography

 The Jackie Robinson Story (1950) – Ernie
 Bright Victory (1951) – Soldier (uncredited)
 The Harlem Globetrotters (1951) – Higgins (uncredited)
 Mysterious Island (1951) – Neb
 Jungle Man-Eaters (1954) – Zuwaba
 Carmen Jones (1954) – Reporter (uncredited)
 Kismet (1955) – Pearl Merchant (uncredited)
 Congo Crossing (1956) – Pompala
 The Girl He Left Behind (1956) – Corporal West (uncredited)
 Up Periscope (1959) – Weary (uncredited)
 Cry Tough (1959) – Policeman (uncredited)
 Take a Giant Step (1959) – Sharpie in Bar (uncredited)
 The Young One (1960, directed by Luis Buñuel) – Traver
 Let No Man Write My Epitaph (1960) – Goodbye George
 Underworld U.S.A. (1961) – Investigator (uncredited)
 The Devil at 4 O'Clock (1961) – Charlie
 13 West Street (1962) – Negro
 Captain Sindbad (1963) – Quinius
 One Potato, Two Potato (1964) – Frank Richards
 Synanon (1965) – Pete
 Stranger on the Run (1967) – Dickory
 The Swimmer (1968) – Chauffeur
 The Lost Man (1969) – Reggie Page
 Nam's Angels (1970) – Capt. Jackson
 Walk the Walk (1970)
 The Organization (1971) – Lt. Jessop
 Hammer (1972) – Davis
 Scream Blacula Scream (1973) – Ragman
 Bucktown (1975) – Harley

References

External links

 

1928 births
2008 deaths
American male film actors
Burials at Inglewood Park Cemetery
African-American male actors
American male television actors
20th-century American male actors
Burials at Riverside National Cemetery
20th-century African-American people
21st-century African-American people